Yoddha is an Indian comic book character, one of a number of titles published by Raj Comics.

Origin
He is the son of a god & a demon. A series is due release focusing more light on his origin.

Story Plot
Story plot revolves around Yoddha the greatest warrior of his time who somehow came into present world from ancient age. How he copes with the modern world & fights against the evil also seeking to go back to his time & exploring the truths of his origin is the main plot for the stories of Yoddha.

Powers and abilities
He has incredible strength. His fighting skills are unparalleled & his weapon, Dhakmaanghan (ढ़क-कमान-घन) is the ultimate multipurpose weapon.

Family, friends, and allies
 Tapraj : His best friend a yogi of highest caliber.
 Madam X : Friend of Yoddha & a secret agent of Indian Intelligence agency who later starts working against the law and government.
 Sneha : Madam X's sister, has a crush on Yoddha.
 Dev Shiromani : His real father, a God.
 Bharat : A police inspector of Rajnagar.
 Badman : A C.I.A. agent.

Enemies
Bonabonu
Kaaldev
Botan
Shalyar
Tainja
 Louhaangi : Once loved Yoddha, now his most vicious enemy.
 Jaanjibar : Place where yodha's love lives
 Ballaar :
Devantaar

Titles
Till now published comics of Yoddha :

External links
 Discussion forum by Raj Comics

Indian comics
Raj Comics superheroes
Fictional Indian people